David Hawkes (b 1964; Wales) is a Professor of English Literature at Arizona State University, Tempe, in the U.S. state of Arizona. He is the author of seven books and the editor of four. He has published over two hundred articles and reviews in such journals as The Nation, The New Criterion, the Times Literary Supplement, Quillette, In These Times, Cabinet Magazine, Bad Subjects, the Journal of the History of Ideas, the Journal of Interdisciplinary Economics,  Literature and Theology, Modern Philology, Renaissance Quarterly, Studies in English Literature, ELH and many other academic and popular publications. Hawkes' work addresses a wide range of subjects.  In 2002 a lengthy correspondence in The Nation followed his critical review essay on Stephen J. Gould's final book. In 2012 a similar controversy followed his critique of Noam Chomsky in the Times Literary Supplement. In 2012 a special issue of the journal Early Modern Culture was devoted to a round-table discussion of his anti-materialist literary theory. Hawkes' work generally explores the links between economics, literature and philosophy from an anti-capitalist perspective. He specifically studies the cultural connections between usury and non-procreative sexuality or 'sodomy.'  In collaboration with the art historian Julia Friedman, Hawkes has recently published a series of articles on the aesthetic implications of Non-Fungible Tokens or "NFTs."

Education and academia
Hawkes attended Stanwell Comprehensive School near Cardiff, Wales. He won a College Scholarship to Oxford University (B.A. 1986), and later the Marjorie Hope Nicolson fellowship to Columbia University (M.A. 1988, M.Phil. 1990, Ph.D. 1992). At Oxford, Hawkes was a student of the left-wing literary critic Terry Eagleton, and an activist in the socialist-feminist group of scholars Oxford English Limited.  At Columbia he worked with the Palestinian critic Edward Said, and contributed to various alternative and underground journals on the Lower East Side. Between 1991 and 2007 Hawkes was first assistant professor, then associate professor of English Literature at Lehigh University, and he has been a full professor of English Literature at Arizona State University since 2007.  He has held visiting appointments at Jadavpur University, Kolkata (2008), Boğaziçi University, Istanbul (2010) and North China Electric Power University, Beijing (2015, 2016, 2018). He received a year-long fellowship from the National Endowment for the Humanities at the Folger Shakespeare Library (2002–03), and the William Ringler Fellowship at the Huntington Library (2006).

Published books  
 Hawkes, David (ed.), Money and Magic in Early Modern Drama (Bloomsbury, 2022) 
 Hawkes, David, The Reign of Anti-logos: Performance in Postmodernity (Palgrave, 2020) 
 Hawkes, David, Shakespeare and Economic Criticism (Bloomsbury, 2015)  
 Hawkes, David (ed. with Richard Newhauser), The Book of Nature and Humanity (Brepols, 2013) 
 Hawkes, David, The Culture of Usury in Renaissance England (Palgrave, 2010) 
 Hawkes, David, John Milton: A Hero of Our Time (Counterpoint, 2009) 
 Hawkes, David, The Faust Myth: Religion and the Rise of Representation (Palgrave, 2007) 
 Hawkes, David (ed.), John Bunyan's The Pilgrim's Progress (Barnes and Noble, 2005) 
 Hawkes, David (ed.), John Milton's Paradise Lost (Barnes and Noble, 2004) 
 Hawkes, David, Idols of the Marketplace: Idolatry and Commodity Fetishism in English Literature (Palgrave, 2001) 
 Hawkes, David, Ideology (Routledge, 1996, Revised second edition, 2003; Korean translation, 2001)

Major articles  
Hawkes, David (with Julia Friedman), 'Against De-Materialization: Tom Wolfe in the Age of NFTs,' Quillette (03/09/2022)
Hawkes, David, 'Modernism, Inflation and the Gold Standard in T.S. Eliot and Ezra Pound,' Modernist Cultures 16.3 (2021)
Hawkes, David (with Julia Friedman), 'The Most Dangerous Place To Be,' The New Criterion (08/27/2020)
Hawkes, David, 'Bawdry, Cuckoldry and Usury in Early Modernity and Postmodernity,' English Literary Renaissance 50.1 (2020)
Hawkes, David, 'Against Financial Derivatives,' Journal of Interdisciplinary Economics (01/02/2019)
Hawkes, David, 'Commodification and Performativity in the Eucharistic Ethics of Luther and Calvin,' Literature and Theology 32.3 (2018)
 Hawkes, David, 'Culture of Debt: the Aesthetic Consequences of Society's Hyper-Usury,' Times Literary Supplement (07/14/2017)
 Hawkes, David, 'How Noam Chomsky's World Works,' Times Literary Supplement (08/29/2012)
 Hawkes, David, ‘Milton and Usury,’ English Literary Renaissance 41:3 (Autumn 2011)
 Hawkes, David, ‘The Evolution of Darwinism,’ The Nation, (6/10/2002)
 Hawkes, David, 'The Politics of Character in Milton's Divorce Tracts,' Journal of the History of Ideas 62.1 (January 2001)

References

External links
 ''Marx and Shakespeare Today: David Hawkes' Lecture at Garrick's Temple 2017
 SurreyShakespeare SCT #22: Shakespeare and Economic Theory with David Hawkes
 David Hawkes: Money, Finance, and the Power of Symbols, Against the Grain, March 7, 2012, KPFA 94.1 FM Radio
 "The Monetary Original Sin: Special Interview with Professor David Hawkes 2021

1964 births
Welsh literary critics
Literary theorists
Living people